Events from 2021 in American Samoa.

Incumbents 

 US House Delegate: Amata Coleman Radewagen
 Governor: Lemanu Peleti Mauga
 Lieutenant Governor: Salo Ale

Events 
Ongoing – COVID-19 pandemic in Oceania; COVID-19 pandemic in American Samoa

3 January – Lemanu Peleti Mauga begins his tenure as Governor of American Samoa,

Sports 

 23 July – 8 August: American Samoa at the 2020 Summer Olympics

References 

2021 in American Samoa
2020s in American Samoa
Years of the 21st century in American Samoa
American Samoa